Mamatov (masculine) or Mamatova (feminine) is a Russian and Turkic surname. Notable people with the surname include:

Bakytbek Mamatov (born 1980), Kyrgyzstani footballer
Jahangir Mamatov (born 1955), Uzbekistani writer and politician
Natalya Mamatova (born 1985), Uzbekistani taekwondo practitioner
Viktor Mamatov (born 1937), Soviet biathlete

Russian-language surnames